The 1988 Badminton Asia Championships was the unofficial tournament of the Badminton Asia Championships. It was held in Bandar Lampung, Indonesia on 6–10 November 1988. The championships were conducted as Invitational Championships (invitation competition).

Medalists 
China won three titles in the men's singles, women's singles and men's doubles, while host country won a title in the women's doubles.

Medal table

Finals

Semi finals

References 

Badminton Asia Championships
Asian Badminton Championships
1988 Badminton Asia Championships
Badminton Asia Championships
Badminton Asia Championships